Randolph County is a county on the central eastern border of the U.S. state of Alabama. As of the 2020 census, the population was 21,967. Its county seat is Wedowee. Its name is in honor of John Randolph, a member of the United States Senate from Virginia. Randolph County was a prohibition or dry county until 2012, when the citizens of Randolph County voted to repeal prohibition.

History
Randolph County was established by the Alabama Legislature on December 18, 1832, following Indian Removal of the Creek people. It was named in honor of John Randolph, a well-known Virginia congressman. Randolph County was one of several counties created out of the last Creek cession formulated by the Treaty of Cusseta, on March 24, 1832. It lies within the Piedmont region, which extends from Alabama to Pennsylvania.

The first white settlers said the county had an abundance of the "purest and coldest freestone water in the world." The area was also noted for its gentle rolling hills.

In 1835 (2 years later), the county seat was moved by the commissioners to nearby Wedowee. This city lies in the center of Randolph County, on a fork of the Little Tallapoosa River. Wedowee was named after a Creek tribal chief "Wah-wah-nee" (or "Wah-dow-wee") of a village here. The European-American town was developed near that site after the Creek were forced out.

The county was developed for agriculture, specifically cotton plantations, which were worked by African-American slaves brought by migrants to the region or transported from the Upper South during the domestic slave trade. It was adjacent to what became known as the Black Belt of Alabama, an area of plantation development in the uplands, where short-staple cotton was cultivated. Many African Americans stayed in the area as sharecroppers and tenant farmers after the Civil War, but left for other opportunities during the first half of the 20th century. The table below shows population declines from 1920 to 1970, reflecting this demographic change. In 2010 some 20 percent of the population was African American, reflecting this history of cotton agriculture.

Geography

Adjacent counties
Cleburne County - north
Carroll County, Georgia - northeast
Heard County, Georgia - east
Troup County, Georgia - southeast
Chambers County - south
Tallapoosa County - southwest
Clay County - west

Demographics

2000 census
As of the 2000 census, there were 22,380 people, 8,642 households, and 6,222 families living in the county.  The population density was 38 people per square mile (15/km2).  There were 10,285 housing units at an average density of 18 per square mile (7/km2).  The racial makeup of the county was 76.38% White (non-Hispanic), 22.24% Black or African American, 0.20% Native American, 0.22% Asian, 0.34% from other races, and 0.62% from two or more races.  3.82% of the population were Hispanic or Latino of any race.

There were 8,642 households, out of which 31.10% had children under the age of 18 living with them; 56.20% were married couples living together, 12.20% had a female householder with no husband present, and 28.00% were non-families. Nearly 25.60% of all households were made up of individuals, and 11.50% had someone living alone who was 65 years of age or older.  The average household size was 2.52, and the average family size was 3.02.

In the county, the population was spread out, with 25.10% under the age of 18, 8.70% from 18 to 24, 26.80% from 25 to 44, 23.50% from 45 to 64, and 15.90% who were 65 years of age or older.  The median age was 38 years. For every 100 females, there were 93.40 males.  For every 100 females age 18 and over, there were 90.00 males.

The median income for a household in the county was $28,675, and the median income for a family was $34,684. Males had a median income of $27,069 versus $20,323 for females. The per capita income for the county was $14,147.  About 12.60% of families and 17.00% of the population were below the poverty line, including 22.10% of those under age 18 and 14.80% of those age 65 or over.

2010 census
As of the census of 2010, there were 22,913 people, 9,164 households, and 6,357 families living in the county. The population density was 39 people per square mile (15/km2). There were 11,982 housing units at an average density of 20.6 per square mile (8/km2). The racial makeup of the county was 76.5% White (non-Hispanic), 20.1% Black or African American, 0.4% Native American, 0.2% Asian, 1.6% from other races, and 1.1% from two or more races. 2.8% of the population were Hispanic or Latino of any race.

There were 9,164 households, out of which 27.0% had children under the age of 18 living with them; 51.0% were married couples living together, 13.9% had a female householder with no husband present, and 30.6% were non-families. Nearly 27.9% of all households were made up of individuals, and 12.6% had someone living alone who was 65 years of age or older. The average household size was 2.46, and the average family size was 2.98.

In the county, the population was spread out, with 23.9% under the age of 18, 8.2% from 18 to 24, 22.9% from 25 to 44, 28.0% from 45 to 64, and 17.0% who were 65 years of age or older. The median age was 41.2 years. For every 100 females, there were 94.0 males. For every 100 females age 18 and over, there were 95.8 males.

The median income for a household in the county was $34,593, and the median income for a family was $43,528. Males had a median income of $31,305 versus $27,908 for females. The per capita income for the county was $19,844. About 14.7% of families and 21.5% of the population were below the poverty line, including 28.0% of those under age 18 and 12.8% of those age 65 or over.

2020 census

As of the 2020 United States census, there were 21,967 people, 8,702 households, and 5,720 families residing in the county.

Government

Transportation

Major highways
 U.S. Highway 431
 State Route 22
 State Route 48
 State Route 77

Rail
CSX Transportation

Communities

City
Roanoke

Towns
Wadley
Wedowee (county seat)
Woodland

Census-designated places
 Graham
 Morrison Crossroads
 Rock Mills

Unincorporated communities

 Almond
 Ava
 Bacon Level
 Corinth (north)
 Corinth (south)
 Dingler
 Folsom
 Hobson
 Liberty Grove
 Louina
 Newell
 Omaha
 Potash
 Swagg

Places of interest
Randolph County is home to Lake Wedowee, a section of the Tallapoosa River.

See also
National Register of Historic Places listings in Randolph County, Alabama
Properties on the Alabama Register of Landmarks and Heritage in Randolph County, Alabama

Notes

External links
 RANDOLPH COUNTY CENTER
 Randolph County map of roads/towns (map © 2007 Univ. of Alabama).

 

 
1832 establishments in Alabama
Populated places established in 1832
Counties of Appalachia